The 1989 Stockholm Open was a men's tennis tournament played on indoor carpet courts at the Stockholm Globe Arena in Stockholm, Sweden that was part of the 1989 Nabisco Grand Prix. It was the 21st edition of the tournament and was held from 6 November until 12 November 1989. First-seeded Ivan Lendl won the singles title.

Finals

Singles

 Ivan Lendl defeated  Magnus Gustafsson 7–5, 6–0, 6–3
 It was Lendl's 10th title of the year and the 88th of his career.

Doubles

 Jorge Lozano /  Todd Witsken defeated  Rick Leach /  Jim Pugh 6–3, 5–7, 6–3
 It was Lozano's 2nd title of the year and the 6th of his career. It was Witsken's 4th title of the year and the 8th of his career.

References

External links
 
 Association of Tennis Professionals – tournament profile
 International Tennis Federation – tournament edition details